The United States House of Representative elections of 2000 in North Carolina were held on 3 November 2000 as part of the biennial election to the United States House of Representatives.  All twelve seats in North Carolina, and 435 nationwide, were elected.

As in 1998, no districts changed hands, with the Republicans winning seven and the Democrats winning five of the twelve seats.  All incumbents ran for office again, with all winning, meaning that no new representatives were elected.

It is not to be confused with the 
Election to the North Carolina House of Representatives, which was held on the same day.

Summary

Results

See also
2000 North Carolina gubernatorial election

Footnotes

2000
2000 North Carolina elections